Locos Sueltos en el zoo (English: Crazies Let Loose in the Zoo) is an Argentine comedy directed by Luis Barros. This stars Emilio Disi, Fabián Gianola, Gladys Florimonte, Alejandro "Marley" Wiebe, Pachu Peña, Karina Jelinek, Luciana Salazar, Nazareno Móttola, Álvaro "Waldo" Navia, Matías Alé, Alberto Fernández de Rosa, Noelia Marzol and Alejandro Müller. It was released on July 9, 2015 in Argentina.

Plot
It's an adventure that focuses on animals at the Buenos Aires Zoo. What visitors don't know about the animals is that like, humans, they can talk. This piques the interest of some gangsters who don't have the best intentions.

Cast
Emilio Disi as Alfredo
Fabián Gianola as  Julián
Gladys Florimonte as Elsa
Alejandro "Marley" Wiebe as Oruga
Pachu Peña as Paco Bielsa
Karina Jelinek as Barbara "Barbie"
Luciana Salazar as Paz 
Nazareno Móttola  as Benjamín "Benja"
Álvaro "Waldo" Navia as Walter Bielsa
Matías Alé as Alejandro Brooklyn
Alberto Fernandez de Rosa as Gregorio
Noelia Marzol as Noelia
Alejandro Müller as Norman
Mariana Antoniale as Delfina
Ivana Nadal as Ivana
Rafael Walger as Pipo
Daniel Ambrosino as A zookeeper

See also
Cinema of Argentina

External links 

2015 films
2010s Spanish-language films
Argentine comedy films
2010s adventure comedy films
2015 comedy films
2010s Argentine films